Brother Alfred is a 1932 British comedy film directed by Henry Edwards and starring Gene Gerrard, Molly Lamont and Elsie Randolph. After she finds him embracing one of the maids, a man's fiancée ends her engagement to him. In an effort to win her back he disguises himself as a fictional twin brother.

Cast
 Gene Gerrard as George Lattaker
 Molly Lamont as Stella
 Elsie Randolph as Mamie
 Bobbie Comber as Billy Marshall
 Clifford Heatherley as Prince Sachsberg
 Hal Gordon as Harold Voles
 Henry Wenman as Uncle George
 Adele Blanche as Pilbeam
 James Carew as Mr. Marshall
 Hugh E. Wright as Sydney
 Harvey Braban as Denis
 Maurice Colbourne as Equerry
 Toni Edgar-Bruce as Mrs. Vandaline

Critical reception
Allmovie noted, "Musical comedy star Gene Gerard breezes his inimitable way through the 1932 British programmer."

References

External links

1932 films
Films shot at British International Pictures Studios
Films based on works by P. G. Wodehouse
Films directed by Henry Edwards
1932 comedy films
British comedy films
Films set in France
British black-and-white films
1930s English-language films
1930s British films